The New Music Ensemble (NME) is a CIO (charity incorporated organisation) of creators and makers of contemporary new music and performance art, based in London UK. It brings together individuals and groups with different cultural backgrounds, educational histories, skills and experiences, with the aim to design relevant contributions to an artistic contemporaneity and the world at large, with conceptual considerations including a strong social and political awareness.

It was first created in 2014 as a student led ensemble at Goldsmiths, University of London, by former music student Rodrigo B. Camacho, for the need of opportunities for student composers and performers to collaborate and perform their work; developing a space for the discussion, development and presentation of this. In the academic year of 2015 the group consolidated and gained shape within and outside the university, through the various efforts of its initial collaborators and supporters wishing to take it forward.

Currently the committee members constitute: Rodrigo B. Camacho (Project Director), Sara Rodrigues (Artistic Director), Roxanna Albayati (Manager), Mahsa Salali (Concert and Publicity Manager) and Gabriele Cavallo (Editorial Director).

The production team includes Marat Ingledeev (web developer and designer), Jaime Gil Larios (Graphics and Filming Director), Ezra-Lloyd Jackson (Photographer), Nicole Trotman (Stage Assistant) and Lewis Wolstanholme (Copywriter).

New Music Ensemble Society 
Establishing a core community within the university environment, the New Music Ensemble is part of the Goldsmiths, University of London, Students Union as a Society. The NME Society main activities are the running of theme based concerts on campus throughout the academic year, hosting pieces composed and performed by Goldsmiths students and alumni, along with regular workshops to experiment with improvisation, graphic scores, extended techniques and methods of composition, as well as open rehearsal sessions for the discussion and development of new pieces.

The group wishes to foster not only the creation and dissemination of new pieces of work but also to immerse its community, consisting both of internal members and external bodies (audiences, partners and other relatives), in a thought-rich, familiar environment, where discussions about the issues pertinent to the artistic of the practitioners and thinkers of this organisation, can be developed and productively held. Working outside the tradition of contemporary classical music composition and performance, the group has detached itself from the limitations of the field and has moved into the larger arena of general performative arts. Some of the disciplines encouraged are:

 Dance and Choreography
 Poetry and Performative Literature
 Performative Installation
 Experimental Theatre
 Fixed media (active perception models)
 Fine Art / Visual art
 Live Electronics
 Experiential Art
 Improvisation

Performances: venues and partners 
Working outside Goldsmiths, the ensemble's core members (consisting of various performers and composers) present work in various venues, particularly in London, including festivals and art-humanities research led projects:

 PLACE

The NME are one of the two ensembles working within the project PLACE, produced by Wamãe (an organisation for the creation and management of cultural projects). PLACE is an interdisciplinary project for artistic, cultural and scientific interchange, based on a methodology of creation-investigation  with a participatory component and of involvement with local communities. The project operates internationally in the fields of artistic creation and scientific investigation.

 Musica Dispersa is one of the promoters of the NME in London, showcasing the ensemble so far at I'klectic Art Lab.
 I'klectik Art Lab, London, January 2015
 Rich Mix, Zealous X Festival, January 2016
 Chalton Gallery, London, January 2016
 Hundred Years Gallery, London, December 2015
 Goldsmiths Sex-Workers Solidarity Society

The NME has collaborated with the SWSS through a bottom-up approach to composition, where a member from SWSS created a piece about her reality working as a prostitute and the relation to reviews written by clients. "The society is the first UK university group that will focus on the aid and support of those within the sex industry." The society follows views in line with the Amnesty International’s draft-policy (July 2015) on respecting, protecting and fulfilling the human rights of sex workers.

References

External links
The New Music Ensemble (NME)

Charities based in London
Music organisations based in the United Kingdom
Goldsmiths, University of London
Musical groups established in 2014
2014 establishments in England